The Tomb of Artaxerxes is a Catacombs located in Marvdasht.This Tomb is part of the Naqsh-e Rostam And This is Artaxerxes I's Tomb.

Gallery

Sources

Naqsh-e Rustam
Achaemenid architecture
Tourist attractions in Fars Province
Mausoleums in Iran
Buildings and structures in Fars Province